Tsubasa Sasaki (born 23 March 1995) is a Japanese slalom canoeist who has competed at the international since 2010.

He finished 12th in the C2 event at the 2016 Summer Olympics in Rio de Janeiro together with Shota Sasaki.

References

1995 births
Living people
Japanese male canoeists
Olympic canoeists of Japan
Canoeists at the 2016 Summer Olympics